David Francis Kelly (May 11, 1956 – June 1, 2020) was an American professional darts player who played in Professional Darts Corporation (PDC) events.

Career
Kelly played in the 1993 BDO World Darts Championship, losing in the first round to Martin Phillips of Wales.

He was brought in to make up the numbers in the inaugural 1994 WDC World Darts Championship, and lost both his matches to Bob Anderson and Gerald Verrier. He also competed in the 1997 WDC World Darts Championship, losing in the preliminary round to Ritchie Gardner.

Kelly left the PDC in 2008. He died on June 1, 2020.

World Championship performances

BDO
 1993: Last 32 (lost to Martin Phillips 1–3) (sets)

PDC
 1994: Last 24 group (lost to Bob Anderson 0–3) and (lost to Gerald Verrier 0–3)
 1997: Preliminary round (lost to Ritchie Gardner 1–3)

References

External links

1956 births
2020 deaths
American darts players
Professional Darts Corporation early era players
Sportspeople from Malden, Massachusetts